Staats is a village and a former municipality in the district of Stendal, in Saxony-Anhalt, Germany. On 1 January 2010, it became part of the town of Stendal.

Former municipalities in Saxony-Anhalt
Stendal